Blacks Point is a locality near Reefton on the West Coast of the South Island of New Zealand.

Blacks Point is located south-west of Reefton on State Highway 7 adjacent to the Inangahua River. The settlement is one of many that were founded in the early 1870s, at a time when over 80 mines were being sunk into the gold-bearing quartz reefs in the Reefton area. Most of the settlers who formed the township of Blacks Point in 1873 were miners from Cornwall.

One attraction is the Blacks Point Museum, a former Wesleyan Methodist Church from 1876 converted to a museum that displays the history of a typical mining town.

References

Buller District
Populated places in the West Coast, New Zealand
West Coast Gold Rush